Giorgi Maskharashvili (გიორგი მასხარაშვილი; born on 18 October 1977 in Tbilisi, Georgia) is a Georgian film, television actor, film director and artist.

Filmography
 As actor
 Paradox (TV Series) (2015) - Giorgi
 The Truth (2015) - Sean Foreman
 Tbilisi, I Love You (2014)
 Brides (2014) - Goga
 The Watchmaker (2011)
 Guli + (2011)
 Tbilisi-Tbilisi  (2005) - Dato
 As director 
 The Watchmaker (2011)
 Tbilisuri Love Story (2009)
 Broadway-45 (2007)
 Post punk (2002)

References

External links

1977 births
Living people
Actors from Tbilisi
20th-century male actors from Georgia (country)
Male film actors from Georgia (country)
21st-century male actors from Georgia (country)
Film directors from Georgia (country)